Nazari Urbina Tejada (born 12 June 1989) is a Mexican professional tennis player.

She has career-high WTA rankings of 601 in singles and 639 in doubles. Urbina Tejada has won one singles title and one doubles title on the ITF Women's Circuit.

She has represented Mexico in Fed Cup competition, where she has a win–loss record of 0–4.

ITF finals

Singles: 3 (1–2)

Doubles: 3 (1–2)

External links
 
 
 

1989 births
Living people
Mexican female tennis players
People from Xalapa
Sportspeople from Acapulco
Texas A&M Aggies women's tennis players
Universiade medalists in tennis
Universiade bronze medalists for Mexico
21st-century Mexican women